Demer Holleran is a female American former professional squash player who represented the United States. She was American champion 9 times. She was inducted into the Pennsylvania Sports Hall of Fame. She received the Tournament of Champions Women's Leadership Award.

References

Year of birth missing (living people)
Living people
American female squash players
Pan American Games silver medalists for Canada
Pan American Games medalists in squash
Squash players at the 1995 Pan American Games
Squash players at the 1999 Pan American Games
Medalists at the 1995 Pan American Games
Medalists at the 1999 Pan American Games
20th-century American women